The National New Play Network (NNPN) is the United States' "alliance of nonprofit theaters that champions the development, production, and continued life of new plays.". It was founded in 1998 by David Goldman.

Programs

Rolling World Premieres 
NNPN's flagship program, the Rolling World Premiere program is a unique model of developing and producing new plays across the country. Each RWP supports three or more theaters that choose to mount the same new play within a 12-month period, allowing the playwright to develop a new work with multiple creative teams in multiple communities. The playwright is part of the process, working on the script and making adjustments based on what is learned from each production and from each city. To-date, NNPN has produced over 85 Rolling World Premieres, totaling over 275 productions.

New Play Exchange 
The New Play Exchange is the world's largest database of plays by living writers. Launched in 2015, the database has grown to include more than 24,000 scripts by more than 6,00 authors.

Residencies

Producers-in-Residence 
In 2011, NNPN established its Producers in Residence program to support season-long residencies at NNPN Core Member theaters for individuals who wish dedicate their careers (or the next phase of their careers) to the creation and production of new work. Selected producers are given a home within a professional theater in which they can supplement their skills, increase their knowledge of the day to day operations of a company focused on new work, and be introduced as theater-makers to a community.

National Showcase of New Plays 
Established in 2002, The National Showcase of New Plays is an annual 3-day event that showcases unproduced plays from across the country. Artistic leaders, literary managers, and other staff from Member Theaters, as well as literary agents, publishers, and independent producers are invited to attend.

Commissions 
NNPN annually gives two major commissions.

The Annual Commission is a $10,000 award given to at least one proposal each year. Core Members nominate proposals for consideration, and the winning Member Theater is responsible for the administration and development of the commissioned play. 

The NNPN Smith Prize for American Theatre is a $5,000 award nominated by a Member Theater and given to an early-career playwright who has been a participant in other NNPN programs to write a play examining the American body politic. The Member Theater who submits the nomination earns up to $2,500 for a developmental workshop of the play. Additionally, the first theater to full produce the commissioned play is awarded an additional $2,500.

Member theatres

References

Theatrical organizations in the United States
Organizations established in 1998